Power Metal is the fourth studio album by American heavy metal band Pantera, released June 24, 1988, through Metal Magic Records. It is the first Pantera album to feature Phil Anselmo on lead vocals, as part of a line-up which would last until the band's official split in 2003, and their last album before shifting to a heavier sound with Cowboys from Hell.

Overview
Phil Anselmo makes his first appearance on vocals, having replaced original singer Terry Glaze. Guitarist Dimebag Darrell (then credited as "Diamond Darrell") also performs vocals on "P*S*T*88".

"Proud to Be Loud" was written and produced by Keel guitarist Marc Ferrari and was originally intended to appear on their 1987 self-titled album; however, Keel would not record their own version until Keel VI: Back in Action in 1998. Pantera's version was used as the party song in the theatrical cut of the 2001 film Donnie Darko, credited to "The Dead Green Mummies". The song also appears on "Trail to Doomsday", a MacGyver TV movie from 1994, as well as the film The Mighty Ducks 2 from the same year.

Terry Glaze co-wrote "Down Below", with an earlier recording of the song appearing on Pantera's third album I Am the Night (1985).

Having not been reissued since its original release on CD, vinyl and cassette, like their previous albums, official non-bootlegged editions of Power Metal have become collectors items, with any that exist often being circulated through online auction websites such as eBay.

Critical reception

In a retrospective review, Bradley Torreano at AllMusic awarded Power Metal 2.5 stars out of 5, noting it as being the culmination of the band's first four albums of hair metal. Torreano described it as "an interesting and transitional early effort from one of the most important metal bands of the '90s." He criticized the lyrics, remarking that they are "the biggest problem, showing none of the gutter poetry that [Phil] Anselmo would develop through time and instead reflecting a bland interest in all things 'rock'". He went on to highlight Dimebag Darrell's guitar work, calling it "one of the more charming elements of the band's early sound" and that "he was obviously a very talented guitarist even then."

LA Weekly called it one of Pantera's best albums, "a solid album of 1980s speed metal".

Track listing

Personnel
All credits adapted from the original CD.
Pantera
Phil Anselmo – lead vocals (except track 10), backing vocals, production (except track 5)
Diamond Darrell – guitar, lead vocals (track 10), background vocals, remixing, production (except track 5)
Rex Rocker – bass, tubular bells, background vocals, production (except track 5)
Vinnie Paul – drums, backing vocals, engineering, remixing, production (except track 5)

Additional personnel
Marc Ferrari – guitar (tracks 3 and 5), backing vocals, production (track 5)
The Eld'n – keyboards, engineering, remixing, production (except track 5)

Technical personnel
Tom Coyne – mastering
Recorded and mixed at Pantego Sound, Pantego, Texas

References

Pantera albums
1988 albums